is a Japanese manga series created by Atsushi Kase which was serialized in Kodansha's Weekly Shōnen Magazine between 1990 and 1999; forty-seven tankōbon were released. The manga won the twenty-third round of the Kodansha Manga Award in 1999 for shōnen manga, beating out titles such as One Piece and Karakuri Circus. The series follows the antics of tenth-grade student Eisaku Yazawa who wants to become a bōsōzoku.

It was adapted into an OVA series consisting of six 50-minute episodes running from 1992 to 1996 produced by Tanaka Productions. The first two episodes were directed by Mitsuo Hashimoto, the third was by Hiromichi Matano, the fourth by Ken Bluestem, and the last two by scriptwriter Takao Yotsuji. The first episode was released in America by ADV Films as Bite Me! Chameleon in 1998. It was also adapted into a live-action film directed by Noboru Matsui and starring Hosei Yamazaki as Eisaku Yazawa in 1996.

In 2008, Fairy Tails Hiro Mashima drew a one-shot remake of Chameleon for the 50th anniversary of Weekly Shōnen Magazine. A pachinko game called CR Chameleon was released in 2008 by Taiyo Elec. Chameleon Seven Years After was published through Weekly Shōnen Magazine on 6 November 2013. A sequel titled  started to be serialized in the following issue. It has spawned two tankōbon volumes published on 16 May, and 17 July 2014.

The manga has sold over 30 million copies as of January 2011.

References

External links
 Anime Jump Review of the OVA
 

1990 manga
ADV Films
Comedy anime and manga
Kodansha manga
Shōnen manga
Yankī anime and manga